Aythami Artiles Oliva (born 2 April 1986), known simply as Aythami, is a Spanish professional footballer who plays as a central defender.

Club career
Aythami was born in Arguineguín, Canary Islands. After successfully representing hometown's UD Las Palmas – having started out as an attacking midfielder at his first club CD Arguineguín– he was bought in July 2007 by Deportivo de La Coruña for €600.000, signing a five-year contract. He only appeared once for the Galicians in his first year, a 0–2 home loss against Recreativo de Huelva and, in January 2008, was loaned to Xerez CD in the Segunda División.

The loan was renewed for the entire the 2008–09 season, and Aythami was an instrumental defensive element for the Andalusians, which achieved a first-ever La Liga promotion. A new loan deal was arranged for the following campaign, and he continued to be first choice, also scoring two league goals but suffering an immediate relegation.

After returning to the Estadio Riazor, Aythami experienced two relegations and one promotion with the team. The free agent re-joined Las Palmas in the summer of 2013 after agreeing to a four-year deal, contributing three goals from 37 appearances in 2014–15 (play-offs included) as the latter returned to the top tier after a 13-year absence.

On 31 January 2018, already a fringe player, Aythami returned to division two and signed with Córdoba CF until June 2020. The following 25 January, he terminated his contract and returned to Las Palmas just hours later.

Aythami signed a one-year deal with Primera División RFEF side Gimnàstic de Tarragona on 22 July 2021, having arrived for free.

References

External links

1986 births
Living people
People from Mogán
Sportspeople from the Province of Las Palmas
Spanish footballers
Footballers from the Canary Islands
Association football defenders
La Liga players
Segunda División players
Segunda División B players
Primera Federación players
UD Las Palmas Atlético players
UD Las Palmas players
Deportivo de La Coruña players
Xerez CD footballers
Córdoba CF players
Gimnàstic de Tarragona footballers
Spain youth international footballers